Varjú is a surname. Notable people with the surname include:

 Péter Varjú (born 1982), Hungarian mathematician
 Vilmos Varjú (1937–1994), Hungarian shot putter
 László Varju (born 1961), Hungarian politician
 Benedek Varju (born 2001), Hungarian footballer